Ihor Zubko (born 30 September 1991) is a Ukrainian football striker. In 2014, he acquired Russian citizenship as Igor Albertovich Zubko.

International
In March 2010, Zubko was called up to the Ukraine national under-19 football team for a series of friendly matches against France in preparation for the 2010 UEFA European Under-19 Football Championship.

References

External links 
 Stats on FC Krymteplytsya club's Site (Rus)
 
 Profile at Crimean Football Union

1991 births
Living people
Ukrainian footballers
Association football forwards
FC Krymteplytsia Molodizhne players
FC Nyva Ternopil players
FC Krystal Kherson players
FC Okean Kerch players
FC Spartak-UGP Anapa players
FC TSK Simferopol players